Croydon London Borough Council is the local authority for the London Borough of Croydon in Greater London, England. It is a London borough council, one of 32 in the United Kingdom capital of London. Croydon is divided into 28 wards, electing 70 councillors.

History

There have previously been a number of local authorities responsible for the Croydon area. The current local authority was first elected in 1964, a year before formally coming into its powers and prior to the creation of the London Borough of Croydon on 1 April 1965. Croydon replaced Croydon Borough Council and Coulsdon and Purley Urban District Council. Croydon was a county borough from 1889, which meant that its council had the functions of both a county and a borough.

It was envisaged that through the London Government Act 1963 Croydon as a London local authority would share power with the Greater London Council. The split of powers and functions meant that the Greater London Council was responsible for "wide area" services such as fire, ambulance, flood prevention, and refuse disposal; with the local authorities responsible for "personal" services such as social care, libraries, cemeteries and refuse collection. As an outer London borough council it has been an education authority since 1965. This arrangement lasted until 1986 when Croydon London Borough Council gained responsibility for some services that had been provided by the Greater London Council, such as waste disposal. Since 2000 the Greater London Authority has taken some responsibility for highways and planning control from the council, but within the English local government system the council remains a "most purpose" authority in terms of the available range of powers and functions.

On 11 November 2020, the council issued a Section 114 Notice, under the Local Government Finance Act 1988, due to its difficult financial position, a de facto declaration of bankruptcy.

Powers and functions
The local authority derives its powers and functions from the London Government Act 1963 and subsequent legislation, and has the powers and functions of a London borough council. It sets council tax and as a billing authority also collects precepts for Greater London Authority functions and business rates. It sets planning policies which complement Greater London Authority and national policies, and decides on almost all planning applications accordingly.  It is a local education authority  and is also responsible for council housing, social services, libraries, waste collection and disposal, traffic, and most roads and environmental health.

Leadership
The London Borough of Croydon is led by the Mayor of Croydon and a cabinet appointed by the Mayor. The Mayor is directly elected by voters in the London Borough of Croydon at the same time as the council election once every four years. The first and current Mayor is Jason Perry who has held the position since 2022.

Cabinet
The current composition of Croydon Council's Cabinet is as follows:

Shadow Cabinet
The largest opposition group on the council forms a Shadow Cabinet. The current composition of Croydon Council's Shadow Cabinet is as follows:

See also
Croydon local elections

References

External links 
London Borough of Croydon website
Croydon Ward Map

Local authorities in London
London borough councils
Politics of the London Borough of Croydon
Mayor and cabinet executives
Local education authorities in England
Billing authorities in England